Anders Eklund may refer to:
 Anders Eklund (boxer)
 Anders Eklund (murderer)